Manuel Lloret Zaragoza (born August 4, 1981, in Muro de Alcoy) is a Spanish cyclist.

Palmarès

2006
1st stage 2 Vuelta a Andalucía
3rd Volta ao Distrito de Santarém
2007
1st Vuelta a la Comunidad de Madrid
1st stage 2
3rd Vuelta a Murcia
3rd Volta ao Alentejo
3rd Spanish National Time Trial Championships
2008
2nd Vuelta a Extremadura
1st stage 4
2009
1st stage 1 Cinturón a Mallorca
1st prologue Vuelta a Zamora

References

1981 births
Living people
Spanish male cyclists
Cyclists from the Valencian Community
People from Comtat
Sportspeople from the Province of Alicante